Elliot Van Strydonck (born 21 July 1988) is a Belgian international field hockey player living in Linkebeek who plays as libero. He confirmed in 2013 that he would stop playing for Royal Leopold Club in Uccle, Belgium and make the transfer to the Dutch club Oranje Zwart in Eindhoven.

Van Strydonck became European vice-champion with Belgium at the 2013 European Championship on home ground in Boom.

References

External links
 

1988 births
Living people
Belgian male field hockey players
Field hockey players at the 2016 Summer Olympics
Olympic field hockey players of Belgium
Olympic silver medalists for Belgium
Olympic medalists in field hockey
Medalists at the 2016 Summer Olympics
Waterloo Ducks H.C. players
Men's Belgian Hockey League players
Oranje Zwart players
Men's Hoofdklasse Hockey players
2014 Men's Hockey World Cup players